Alan Schlesinger, (aka Alan Gold) (born January 4, 1958) is an American attorney, entrepreneur, and Republican politician from Florida. He has previously served as the Mayor of Derby, Connecticut from 1994 to 1998 and as a member of the Connecticut House of Representatives from 1981 to 1993.

Schlesinger was the Republican nominee for the United States Senate in 2006, a year when incumbent Democrat Joe Lieberman lost his primary to Ned Lamont but continued to the general election on the Connecticut for Lieberman party line, defeating Lamont 49.7%-39.7%,  with Schlesinger in third place receiving 9.6%. After his defeat, Schlesinger moved to Florida and considered running for Congress from there in 2008 and 2010. In the year 2014, he finished in second place for the Republican nomination behind Carl J. Domino.

Early career
After graduating from Amity Regional High School (which serves Orange, Woodbridge, and Bethany), Schlesinger earned a bachelor's degree from the Wharton School of Finance of the University of Pennsylvania in Economics, and later a J.D. from the University of Connecticut School of Law. He then entered private law practice, starting the law firm of Schlesinger and Barbara in Shelton. From 1979-1981, he was a member of the Board of Selectmen of Orange before his election as a State Representative. He would serve six terms in the Connecticut General Assembly, he chose not to run for re-election in 1992 and was succeeded by Democrat Ellen Scalettar.

He was then elected as Mayor of Derby in 1993, defeating incumbent Mayor Gino S. DiMauro Jr. He served in that capacity from 1994 until 1998. He chose not to run for re-election in 1997 and was succeeded by Democrat  Marc J. Garofalo. Schlesinger ran against Garofalo in 1999, but was defeated. He ran unsuccessfully for the Republican Congressional nomination from the Fifth District three times: in 1984 (defeated by then State Rep. John G. Rowland), 1990 (defeated by then Waterbury Alderman Gary Franks) and 1998 (defeated by then State Senator Mark Nielsen). Both Rowland and Franks went on to win election to the Congressional seat, and Nielsen became counsel to Massachusetts Gov. Mitt Romney after two unsuccessful attempts to win the seat.

2006 U.S. Senate campaign

In April 2006, Schlesinger announced his intention to run for the U.S. Senate seat currently held by Joe Lieberman, with a pledge to spend $500,000 of his personal funds on the campaign.

Schlesinger has received strong criticism for his gambling at Connecticut casinos under the alias "Alan Gold". He is accused of using the alias to avoid detection as a card counter, while Schlesinger maintains he only used the alias to protect his privacy as a public official. (Card counting is not an illegal activity, but many casinos exercise their right to remove card counters from their businesses.) Many contended that the scandal would jeopardize Schlesinger's Senate campaign, and fellow Republicans such as Connecticut Governor Jodi Rell suggested that he withdraw. . State party chairman George Gallo said he felt Schlesinger "cleared the air" after he gave a press conference after the story broke, and said that he had not asked Schlesinger to step aside.  On July 21, the Hartford Courant reported Schlesinger had been sued twice by New Jersey casinos for gambling debts, but had settled out of court, paying back both debts with interest.

He supports a campaign program of immigration, tax, social security, Medicare, and spending reform. He is a self-described "moderate-conservative"; among other issue stances, he opposes affirmative action and amnesty for illegal immigrants, and, while he says he is otherwise pro-choice, supports mandatory parental notification before a minor can have an abortion. He says he can reach out to independents, as he did to win in Derby, a city where Republicans are outnumbered 4:1.

Throughout the campaign he was considered a longshot, and many Republicans declined to support him, turning instead to Lieberman.  President George W. Bush declined to endorse Schlesinger's candidacy. White House Press Secretary Tony Snow has said that the Connecticut Republican Party "has suggested that we not make an endorsement in that race and so we're not."

Democratic Senator Joe Lieberman won the election, running as an Independent after losing the Democratic Party's nomination in an August primary. Upon his victory, Lieberman announced he would caucus with the Democratic majority in the Senate in the 110th United States Congress.

Move to Florida
After his defeat, Schlesinger became involved in Florida politics. He previously lived there part-time in Palm Beach County and moved there full-time.

The incumbent was Democrat Patrick Murphy.

In an article published on August 4, 2014 by George Bennett of the Palm Beach Post, Schlesinger claimed an internal poll conducted by Cherry Communications showed that 53% of potential voters in the Republican Primary were undecided at the time, so he decided to contribute $100,000 more to his campaign efforts. Schlesinger also said that the same poll showed Carl J. Domino remains the front-runner of the race but that he was in second place and the "only one that's within striking distance".

The Republican Primary for the  currently featured four other candidates besides Domino and Schlesinger: Beverly Hires, Brian Lara, Calvin Turnquest and Nick Wukoson. Schlesinger finished in second place in the August 26 primary with 24% of the vote, while Domino won with 38%.

References

External links
 Alan Schlesinger on the Issues
 Connecticut Conservative Interview with Schlesinger
 Alan Schlesinger For Congress
 

1960 births
Connecticut lawyers
Living people
Mayors of places in Connecticut
Republican Party members of the Connecticut House of Representatives
People from Derby, Connecticut
People from Palm Beach County, Florida
Florida Republicans
Candidates in the 2006 United States elections
University of Connecticut alumni
Wharton School of the University of Pennsylvania alumni